"Paradise" is a 1931 song with music by Nacio Herb Brown and lyrics by Gordon Clifford. It was first sung by Pola Negri in RKO Pictures' 1932  film A Woman Commands, and has since been heard in many other films, including a memorable performance by Gloria Grahame (dubbed by Kaye Lorraine), in the 1949 Nicholas Ray film A Woman's Secret.

The song was recorded by many artists in 1932 and there were popular versions by Guy Lombardo, Leo Reisman, Bing Crosby (recorded on March 15, 1932) and Russ Columbo.

Other recordings
Dorothy Lamour (1939)
Frank Sinatra (1945)
Helen Forrest (1950)
Eddie Fisher (1952)
Bing Crosby re-recorded the song for his 1954 album Bing: A Musical Autobiography
Sylvia Syms (1954)
Patti Page (1955)
Jerry Vale (1958) - for his I Remember Russ album
Nat King Cole (1958) - for his album The Very Thought of You
Vic Damone
Sammy Turner (1960)
Lena Horne (1962) - for her album Lena on the Blue Side
Frank Ifield (1965)
Dinah Shore - for her 1976 album For the Good Times

References

1931 songs
Songs with music by Nacio Herb Brown
Guy Lombardo songs